Onychomesa is a little-known genus of thread-legged bug in the subfamily Emesinae. Three species have been described, one from India, Japan, and Taiwan.

Partial species list
Onychomesa sauteri Wygodzinsky, 1966
Onychomesa susainthani Wygodzinsky, 1966
Onychomesa gokani Ishikawa, 2000

References

Reduviidae
Hemiptera of Asia